Apache Incubator is the gateway for open-source projects intended to become fully fledged Apache Software Foundation projects.

The Incubator project was created in October 2002 to provide an entry path to the Apache Software Foundation for projects and codebases wishing to become part of the Foundation's efforts. All code donations from external organizations and existing external projects wishing to move to Apache must enter through the Incubator.

The Apache Incubator project serves on the one hand as a temporary container project until the incubating project is accepted and becomes a top-level project of the Apache Software Foundation or becomes subproject of a proper project such as the Jakarta Project or Apache XML. On the other hand, the Incubator project documents how the Foundation works, and how to get things done within its framework. This means documenting process, roles and policies within the Apache Software Foundation and its member projects.

See also

 List of Apache Software Foundation projects

External links
 Apache Incubator
 All projects in incubator
 Apache Incubator OpenOfficeProposal
 HCatalog Mailing List Archives

Incubator
Computing websites
Internet properties established in 2002